Sacred Heart College, is a private Catholic primary and secondary school, located in Sucre, in the Chuquisaca Department of Bolivia. The co-educational school was founded by the Society of Jesus in 1912.

Notable alumni 

  Alejandro Pereyra Doria Medinapoet and filmmaker 
 Julio Garrett Ayllónthirty-third Vice President of Bolivia
 Jaime Paz Zamorasixtieth President of Bolivia
 Nicolás Tudorretired professional football player
 Sebastian "Pony" Ortuñoprofessional football player
 Bernardo Gantier ÁvilaJesuit priest, historian and philosopher
 Guillermo Francovichplaywright, essayist, humorist, and philosopher

See also

 Catholic Church in Bolivia
 Education in Bolivia
 List of Jesuit schools

References

Educational institutions established in 1913
Jesuit primary schools in Bolivia
Sucre
Jesuit secondary schools in Bolivia
1913 establishments in Bolivia
Buildings and structures in Chuquisaca Department